The Asociación Guías Scouts del Paraguay (roughly Guide Scout Association of Paraguay) is the national Guiding organization of Paraguay.

References

See also
 Asociación de Scouts del Paraguay

World Association of Girl Guides and Girl Scouts member organizations
Scouting and Guiding in Paraguay

Youth organizations established in 1923